Wajir West Constituency is an electoral constituency in Kenya. It is one of six constituencies in the northeastern Wajir County. The constituency has 12 wards, all electing councillors to the Wajir County Council. It was established for the 1966 elections. The constituency is predominantly inhabited by Somalis.

Members of Parliament 
 2022 General Election -to date        Yusuf Mohamed Farah     [[     Orange Democratic Movement    ODM||

Wards

References 

Constituencies in Wajir County
Constituencies in North Eastern Province (Kenya)
1966 establishments in Kenya
Constituencies established in 1966